Escape from Taliban is a 2003 Indian film directed by Ujjwal Chatterjee. The film is based on the story A Kabuliwala's Bengali Wife by Sushmita Banerjee, who fled Afghanistan in 1995 after six years of living there with her Afghan husband.

Sushmita Banerjee, whose book inspired this movie, was shot dead by suspected Taliban militants in Afghanistan in September 2013.

Plot 
This story based on the story of Sushmita Bannerjee, a Bengali Brahmin woman, who was married to an Afghan businessman in 1989, shifted to Afghanistan in the same year and later fled back to India in 1995 to escape the Taliban who issued a death sentence for her because she refused to abide by their rule on converting to Islam.

Cast 
Manisha Koirala as Sushmita Banerjee/Sayed Kamal
Nawab Shah as Jaanbaaz
 Vineeta Malik as Abu
 Prithvi Zutshi as Dranai Chacha
 Alyy Khan as Abdul Malik
 Yusuf Hussain as Colonel Banerjee

Production

The film was shot in Jaisalmer, Hyderabad, Mumbai and Ladakh.

Music 
Lyrics were penned by Mehboob.

References

External links 
 

2003 films
2000s Hindi-language films
2000s Urdu-language films
Films scored by Babul Bose
Films set in Afghanistan
Documentary films about women in Afghanistan
Works about the Taliban
Indian films based on actual events
Indian biographical drama films
Indian historical drama films
Urdu-language Indian films
War in Afghanistan (2001–2021) films